= Arbeiterpost (Gleiwitz) =

- Founded: December 1919
- Ceased publication: March 1920
- Political alignment: USPD
- Language: German language

Arbeiterpost ('Workers Mail') was a German language socialist newspaper published from Gleiwitz, Upper Silesia, Weimar Germany (present-day Gliwice in Poland) between December 1919 and March 1920. Arbeiterpost was the organ of the regional organization of the Independent Social Democratic Party of Germany (USPD) in Upper Silesia.
